Richmond Hill Centre Terminal is a York Region Transit, Viva, and GO Transit bus terminal in Richmond Hill, Ontario. Despite its name, the terminal is not located in downtown Richmond Hill, but is situated 4 km (2.5 miles) to the south at the city's southern limits, bordering Vaughan and Markham, near the connecting road that links the grade-separated Yonge Street and Highway 7 intersection. It opened on September 4, 2005. It is immediately west of the Langstaff GO train station, but is separated by the tracks. A pedestrian bridge over the tracks was opened in March 2008 to connect the bus terminal and the train station. Public washrooms were added to the terminal in December 2012.

Bus service

Platform assignments
All routes are YRT unless indicated otherwise.
Platform 1: Viva Purple, Viva Pink eastbound
Platform 2: Viva Orange
Platform 3: Viva Blue southbound, Viva Pink southbound
Platform 4: Viva Blue northbound
Platform 5: 1 Highway 7, 91B Bayview, 760 Vaughan Mills/Wonderland, Mobility On-Request
Platform 6: 83 Trench, 87 Autumn Hill
Platform 7: 99 Yonge southbound
Platform 8: 86 Newkirk-Red Maple, 99 Yonge northbound
Platform 9: GO Transit westbound 51-52-54: 407 East
Platform 10: GO Transit 40: Hamilton/Richmond Hill Pearson Express to Hamilton GO Centre via Toronto Pearson International Airport and Square One Bus Terminal
Platform 11: GO Transit eastbound 51-52-54: 407 East

As of April 26, 2008, GO Transit commenced Airport Express GO Bus service directly from this terminal to Toronto Pearson International Airport, providing one arrival and departure in each of 24 hours a day, 7 days a week. Travel time is approximately 20 minutes. This service was subsequently extended to Hamilton via Mississauga. In 2011, GO Transit has moved all bus services (except route 61 Richmond Hill) from Langstaff GO Station to Richmond Hill Centre Terminal.  Passengers using the GO Transit bus to Pearson Airport should check with York Region Transit before parking overnight in the parking lot. In September 2020, GO Transit extended route 45B to Richmond Hill Centre, which provides increased weekday frequencies to Unionville GO Station, Square One Bus Terminal while bypassing Toronto Pearson International Airport, and new access to Streetsville GO Station in Mississauga from Richmond Hill.

There are no sidewalks for pedestrian access to this terminal.

Subway extension proposal
Under the MoveOntario 2020 plan, the Yonge subway line will extend north from Finch Station to Richmond Hill Centre Terminal. In a 2012 concept design report, the subway station was located in a north-south orientation underneath the cinema and Hightech Road, with three options for integration with a bus terminal and the Langstaff GO station. In March 2021, after budget considerations, Metrolinx announced that the two northern-most stations, one at Highway 7 and another  further north at High Tech Road, would be built on the surface. From south of Highway 7, the extension would veer east away from Yonge Street to surface and then turn north along a railway corridor.

References

External links

 YRT/Viva: Richmond Hill Centre Terminal
 GO Transit: Richmond Hill Centre Bus Terminal

York Region Transit Terminals
Transport in Richmond Hill, Ontario
Transport infrastructure completed in 2005
2005 establishments in Ontario